Hal Linden (born Harold Lipshitz, March 20, 1931) is an American stage and screen actor, television director and musician.

Linden began his career as a big band musician and singer in the 1950s. After a stint in the United States Army, he began an acting career, first working in summer stock and off-Broadway productions. Linden found success on Broadway when he replaced Sydney Chaplin in the musical Bells Are Ringing. In 1962, he starred as Billy Crocker in the off-Broadway revival of the Cole Porter musical Anything Goes. In 1971, he won a Best Actor Tony Award for his portrayal of Mayer Rothschild in the musical The Rothschilds.

In 1974, Linden landed his best-known role as the title character in the television comedy series Barney Miller. The role earned him seven Primetime Emmy Award and three Golden Globe Award nominations. During the series' run, Linden also hosted two educational series, 
Animals, Animals, Animals and FYI. He won two special Daytime Emmy Awards for the latter series. Linden won a third Daytime Emmy Award for a guest-starring role on CBS Schoolbreak Special in 1995. Linden has since continued his career on the stage, in films and guest-starring roles on television. He released his first album of pop and jazz standards, It's Never Too Late, in 2011.

Early life
Hal Linden was born on March 20, 1931, in The Bronx. He is the youngest son of Frances (née Rosen) and Charles Lipshitz, a Lithuanian Jew who immigrated to the United States in 1910 and later owned his own printing shop. His older brother, Bernard, became a professor of music at Bowling Green State University. Linden attended Herman Ridder Junior High School and the High School of Music and Art, going on to study music at Queens College, City University of New York. He later enrolled in Baruch College and then City College of New York where he received a Bachelor of Arts in business.

During his youth, Linden wanted to be a big band singer and bandleader. Before embarking on a career in music, he decided to change his name, stating, "'Swing and Sway with Harold Lipshitz' just didn't parse." While riding on a bus from Philadelphia to New York through the town of Linden, New Jersey, he saw the name Linden on the water tower and changed his name to Hal Linden. During the 1950s, he toured with Sammy Kaye, Bobby Sherwood, and other big bands of the era. Linden played the saxophone and clarinet and also sang.

He enlisted in the United States Army in 1952 and was sent to Fort Belvoir and played in the United States Army Band. While he was in Fort Belvoir, a friend recommended that he see the touring production of Guys and Dolls playing in Washington, D.C. After seeing the show, Linden decided to become an actor. He was discharged from the Army in 1954.

Career
Linden replaced Sydney Chaplin in the Broadway production of Bells Are Ringing in 1958. He made a further breakthrough on the New York City stage in 1962 when he was cast as Billy Crocker in the revival of Cole Porter's Anything Goes.

Linden's career slowed in the 1960s. During this time, he dubbed English dialogue for various foreign films, did voiceover work for commercials and sang jingles, and performed in industrial musicals such as Diesel Dazzle (1966). His career was revived in the 1970s when he was cast as Mayer Rothschild in the 1971 musical The Rothschilds. The role earned him a Tony Award for Best Actor in a Musical. In 1973, he co-starred opposite Tony Lo Bianco in the NBC television film Mr. Inside/Mr. Outside. The film was intended to be the pilot for a proposed series but was not picked up by the network.

Barney Miller
In 1974, Linden landed the starring role in the ABC television police sitcom Barney Miller. He portrayed the eponymous captain of the 12th Precinct in Greenwich Village, Manhattan, New York City. He earned seven Emmy Award nominations for his work on the series, one for each season. Linden is tied with Matt LeBlanc and John Goodman for the most Outstanding Lead Actor in a Comedy Series Emmy Award nominations without ever winning. He also earned four Golden Globe Award nominations for Best Actor in a Musical or Comedy. The series aired from 1975 to 1982. Linden later said that leaving Broadway to work on Barney Miller was his most irrational act and also one of his best decisions.

During the run of Barney Miller, Linden served as the narrator and host of the ABC children's shows Animals, Animals, Animals and FYI. He won two Daytime Emmys for Outstanding Individual Achievement for his host work on FYI. in 1984 and 1985.

Later career
After Barney Miller ended in 1982, Linden appeared in several television films, including I Do! I Do! (1982), the television adaptation of the musical of the same name, and Starflight: The Plane That Couldn't Land (1983). Also in 1982, he was the producers' first choice for the starring role of Dr. Donald Westphall in St. Elsewhere, but turned down the opportunity without reading the script or meeting the producers, because he wanted to take a break from television. (The role was then given to Ed Flanders.)  

In 1984, he costarred in the television film Second Edition. The film was intended to be a series but was not picked up by CBS. The following year, Linden portrayed studio head Jack L. Warner in the television biopic My Wicked, Wicked Ways: The Legend of Errol Flynn.

In 1986, Linden returned to episodic television in the NBC series Blacke's Magic. He played the lead character, Alexander Blacke, a magician who solves mysteries with the help of his father Leonard (Harry Morgan), a retired carnival magician and sometimes confidence man. The series was canceled after 13 episodes. In 1988, he co-starred in the romantic comedy A New Life, directed by Alan Alda. In 1992, Linden tried his hand at television again with the leading role in the comedy-drama series Jack's Place. In the series, Linden portrayed Jack Evans, a retired jazz musician who ran a restaurant that was frequented by patrons who learned lessons about love. The show was often compared to The Love Boat by critics as it featured a different weekly guest star. The series premiered as a mid-season replacement but did well enough in the ratings for ABC to order additional episodes. Viewership soon declined and ABC chose to cancel the series in 1993. The next year, Linden appeared in the CBS sitcom The Boys Are Back. That series was also low rated and canceled after 18 episodes. In 1995, Linden won his third Daytime Emmy Award for his 1994 guest-starring role as Rabbi Markovitz on CBS Schoolbreak Special.

In 1996, Linden had a supporting role in the television film The Colony, opposite John Ritter and June Lockhart. The role was a departure for Linden as he played the villainous head of a home owner's association of a gated community. In 1999, he had a guest role in the last The Rockford Files reunion TV film, The Rockford Files: If It Bleeds... It Leads. He continued his career in the late 1990s and 2000s with guest roles on Touched by an Angel, The King of Queens, Gilmore Girls, Law & Order: Criminal Intent, and Hot in Cleveland. He also narrated episodes of Biography and The American Experience, and voiced Dr. Selig on the animated series The Zeta Project. In 2002, Linden received a Golden Palm Star on the Palm Springs, California, Walk of Stars.

Linden continued to have an active stage career. He appeared in the Toronto production of Tuesdays with Morrie in 2009. In July 2011, he appeared opposite Christina Pickles in the Colony Theatre's production of On Golden Pond. In 2011, Linden starred in a touring production of Shine featuring local professional talent. Linden also starred in Under My Skin, which premiered at the Pasadena Playhouse on September 19, 2012, and ran through October 2012. In 2013, Linden guest-starred in a season eight episode of Supernatural as a rabbi. In 2014, Linden guest-starred in an episode of the comedy series 2 Broke Girls. In 2015, he appeared at the Old Globe Theatre in the West Coast premiere of The Twenty Seventh Man starring as Yevgeny Zunser.

Music
After the success of Barney Miller, Linden decided to revive his music career with a nightclub act. In his act, Linden played the clarinet, performed pop and Broadway standards backed by a big band, and discussed his life and career.

In March 2011, he began touring with the cabaret show An Evening with Hal Linden: I'm Old Fashioned. The show, which ran through 2012, was later released on DVD. In April 2011, Linden released his first album, It's Never Too Late. The album features a collection of jazz, Broadway and pop standards that Linden began recording around the time he was touring in the early 1980s. Due to a lack of interest, he shelved the songs. Linden decided to finish the album on the advice of his tour booker.

Personal life
Linden is the spokesman for the Jewish National Fund, a position he has held since 1997.

Linden met dancer Fran Martin while doing summer stock in 1955. They married in 1958 and had four children. Martin died in 2010.

In 1984, Linden narrated a short film on former President Harry S. Truman, which was shown during that year's Democratic National Convention.

Broadway credits

Industrial musicals

Filmography

Awards

References

External links
 
 
 
 
 
 

1931 births
20th-century American male actors
21st-century American male actors
Living people
Male actors from New York City
American male film actors
American jazz singers
American male musical theatre actors
American people of Lithuanian-Jewish descent
American male soap opera actors
American male television actors
American television directors
American male voice actors
Big band clarinetists
Big band saxophonists
Big band singers
City College of New York alumni
Daytime Emmy Award winners
Jewish American male actors
Jewish American musicians
Singers from New York City
Queens College, City University of New York alumni
Tony Award winners
Traditional pop music singers
United States Army soldiers
United States Army personnel of the Korean War
The High School of Music & Art alumni
Jazz musicians from New York (state)
21st-century clarinetists
21st-century American male musicians
American male jazz musicians
21st-century American Jews